Shane Poggenpoel (born 12 March 1984 in Cape Town, Western Cape) is a South African football (soccer) defensive midfielder for Tuks.

External links
Player's profile at absapremiership.co.za

1984 births
South African soccer players
Living people
Sportspeople from Cape Town
Cape Town Spurs F.C. players
SuperSport United F.C. players
Association football midfielders
Cape Coloureds
Maritzburg United F.C. players